
Triakontameron is a suite of 30 pieces for piano composed in 1920 by Leopold Godowsky; each was written in a single day, and all are written in three-four time.  The title was inspired by that of Boccaccio's Decameron.  Among the best-known excerpts of the suite are Alt Wien, Nocturnal Tangier, and Ethiopian Serenade.

References

Citations

Sources

External links 
 

1920 compositions
Compositions by Leopold Godowsky
Compositions for solo piano
Suites (music)